Tetraopes cleroides is a species of beetle in the family Cerambycidae. It was described by James Thomson in 1860. It is known from Mexico.

References

Tetraopini
Beetles described in 1860